Jakob Jung (27 October 1895 – unknown) was a German Nazi Party official who served in its early days as the Gauleiter of the Saar when it was being administered by France and the United Kingdom under a League of Nations mandate.

Biography 
Jakob Jung was born in Rückweiler in the Rhenish Palatinate and later lived in Sankt Arnual (today, part of Saarbrücken). He worked as an administrative assistant in the mayoral office in Brebach (today, also part of Saarbrücken). 

On 30 May 1926, Jung assumed the role of the Nazi Party Ortsgruppenleiter (Local Group Leader) in Saarbrücken. On 29 November 1926, he formally was approved for membership in the Party (membership number 47,862). This was followed on 8 December 1926 by his appointment as the first official Ortsgruppenleiter of Saarbrücken, as well as the Gauleiter of the Nazi Party for the entire Saar region. He succeeded Walter Jung, who had unofficially headed the Party in the Saar region up to that point, and was confirmed in these posts on 1 January 1927 by Adolf Hitler. 

On 13 March 1927, Jung co-founded an Ortsgruppe in Überherrn. On 21 April 1929, he resigned his posts in an internal policy dispute within the Saar branch of the Party over the question of opposition to the occupation authorities. He was opposed by his Party comrade and rival , who favored a harder line and accused Jung of cowardice.

Jung remained a Party member and, as an Alter Kampfer (Old Fighter), was later awarded the Golden Party Badge. In March 1935, he was appointed Burgermeister (Mayor) of Gersweiler (today, a district of Saarbrücken). He was awarded the Nazi Party Long Service Award in bronze and in silver. Nothing further is known of his fate.

References

Sources

External links 
Jakob Jung entry in the Saarland Biography

1895 births
Year of death unknown
Gauleiters
Mayors of places in Germany
Nazi Party officials
People from the Palatinate (region)